Source Music (romanized: ssoseumyujig) is a South Korean entertainment company established in 2009 by So Sung-jin. In July 2019, the company was acquired by Hybe Corporation, making the company part of the collective term "Hybe Labels". The company currently manages girl group Le Sserafim, and previously managed soloist Kan Mi-youn and girl groups Glam and GFriend.

History

2009–2014: Foundation and first generation artists 

Source Music was founded on November 17, 2009 by So Sung-jin, who worked at SM Entertainment as a talent manager for various artists between 2000 and 2002. He later moved to JYP Entertainment.

In 2010, the label's first-ever artist, female soloist Kan Mi-youn (formerly of Baby Vox) released her first digital single titled "Going Crazy". The music video featured Lee Joon and Mir from MBLAQ. The song peaked at #11 on South Korea's national chart Gaon.

In 2012, Glam was formed as a joint collaboration between Source Music and Big Hit Entertainment and was composed of Dahee, Trinity, Zinni, Miso and Jiyeon. Following Trinity's departure, they continued as a four-member group. The group was active until 2014 and was officially disbanded in January 2015, after Dahee was sentenced to one year imprisonment for a case of extortion against actor Lee Byung-hun.

2015–2019 

In 2015, GFriend was formed. The group consisted of members Sowon, Yerin, Eunha, Yuju, SinB, and Umji. They made their debut with the extended play Season of Glass on January 15, 2015.

2019–present: Acquisition by Hybe Corporation 

In July 2019, Hybe Corporation (formerly Big Hit Entertainment) acquired Source Music, making the company a subsidiary under Hybe Labels, Hybe Corp.'s subdivision of labels, and keeping its existing management and style. On March 22, 2021, Source Music, as well as the other labels under Hybe Labels, moved to its new headquarters in the Yongsan Trade Center in the Yongsan District, the new headquarters of its parent company, Hybe Corporation. On March 31, 2021, the official website of Source Music changed its physical address to the new building in Yongsan, Seoul.

Following the completion of their six-year contract, all GFriend members left the company on May 22, 2021, therefore marking the disbandment of the group.
On March 14, 2022, former Iz*One members Sakura Miyawaki and Kim Chae-won signed exclusive contracts with Source Music and confirmed their debut in a new group. Le Sserafim, consisting of Sakura, Kim Chae-won, Huh Yun-jin, Kazuha, Kim Ga-ram and Hong Eun-chae, debuted on May 2 with the extended play Fearless.

On April 13, 2022, the company was fined 3 million won by the Korea Personal Information Protection Commission and a correction order for disclosing personal information to third parties and failing to protect personal information. ​Source Music used Google's questionnaire to reimburse membership fees related to the dissolution of the GFriend group, and the personal information of 22 survey participants was compromised due to improper disclosure of survey results.

Artists

Groups
 Le Sserafim

Former artists 
 8Eight (2009–2014, co-managed by Big Hit Music)
 Glam (2012–2015, co-managed by Big Hit Music)
 Eden Beatz (2012–2015)
 MI.O (2014–2018)
 Kan Mi-youn (2009–2014)
 GFriend (2015–2021)

Notes

References

External links
 Source Music at Naver

K-pop record labels
South Korean record labels
Talent agencies of South Korea
2009 establishments in South Korea
Companies based in Seoul
Entertainment companies established in 2009
Record labels established in 2009
2019 mergers and acquisitions
Hybe Corporation